Long Run is a  long 2nd order tributary to Wheeling Creek in Ohio County, West Virginia.

Variant names 
According to the Geographic Names Information System, it has also been known historically as:
 Woods Run

Course 
Long Run rises about 2 miles west of Clinton, West Virginia, in Ohio County and then flows southwest to Wheeling Creek at Wheeling.

Watershed 
Long Run drains  of area, receives about 40.5 in/year of precipitation, has a wetness index of 298.89, and is about 53% forested.

See also 
 List of rivers of West Virginia

References 

Rivers of Ohio County, West Virginia
Rivers of West Virginia